Petroxestes is a shallow, elongate boring (a type of trace fossil) originally found excavated in carbonate skeletons and hardgrounds of the Upper Ordovician of North America (Wilson and Palmer, 1988, 2006). These Ordovician borings were likely made by the mytilacean bivalve Corallidomus as it ground a shallow groove in the substrate to maintain its feeding position (Pojeta and Palmer, 1976). They are thus the earliest known bivalve borings (Taylor and Wilson, 2003). Petroxestes was later described from the Lower Silurian of Anticosti Island (Canada) by Tapanila and Copper (2002) and the Miocene of the Caribbean by Pickerill et al. (2001).

References
 
 
 
 
 
 

Boring fossils
Paleozoic life of Quebec